In Hawaiian mythology, Nana-Ula or Nanaulu is the hero who led his people from Tahiti to Hawaii.  He was the first King of Hawaii, and began the royal dynasty.

References

Hawaiiana
Hawaiian mythology